Allied forces or Allied force may refer to:

Military
Allies of World War II, the alliance that opposed the Axis powers
Allied forces (World War I), the alliance that opposed the Central Powers
Allied Forces Baltic Approaches, a command of NATO active from 1962 to 2002
Allied Forces North Norway, a command of NATO active from 1952 to 1994
Allied Forces Northern Europe, a command of NATO active from 1952 to 1994
Allied Forces Mediterranean, a command of NATO active from 1952 to 1967
Operation Allied Force or NATO bombing of Yugoslavia

Other uses
Allied Forces (album), 1981 studio album by Triumph
 Falcon 4.0: Allied Force, a flight simulator video game

See also 
 Alliance
 Allied (disambiguation)
 Allied Powers (disambiguation)